Staurophora is a genus of moths of the family Noctuidae.

Species
 Staurophora celsia (Linnaeus, 1758)

References
Natural History Museum Lepidoptera genus database
Staurophora at funet

Hadeninae